Zou or ZOU may refer to:

Places
Zou (state), Chinese state that existed during the Zhou Dynasty
Zou, Ivory Coast, town and sub-prefecture in Ivory Coast
Zou Department of Benin
Zou River of Benin
Zoucheng, formerly Zou County, in Jining, Shandong, China

Other uses
Zou (surname) (邹), a Chinese surname
Zou (TV series), a French animated television series
Zou people, indigenous community living along Indo-Burma frontier
Zimbabwe Open University or "ZOU"

See also
 Zo language, the language spoken by the Zo people
 Zo people, a group of indigenous tribe in Burma and northeast India
 Zoo (disambiguation)
 Zu (disambiguation)

Language and nationality disambiguation pages